Nesus or Nasus or Nesos or Nasos was a town in ancient Acarnania.

Its site is located near modern Portes on Skoupas.

References

Populated places in ancient Acarnania
Former populated places in Greece